Pseudostyne is a genus of longhorn beetles of the subfamily Lamiinae, containing the following species:

 Pseudostyne alboplagiata Breuning, 1940
 Pseudostyne ratovosoni Breuning, 1970

References

Desmiphorini